"Couldn't Do Nothin' Right" is a song written by Karen Brooks and Gary P. Nunn, and recorded by American country music artist Rosanne Cash.  It was released in February 1980 as the second single from Cash's album Right or Wrong.  The song reached number fifteen on the Billboard Hot Country Singles & Tracks chart, becoming her second major hit and her first major hit as a solo artist. In addition, the song became Cash's second entry on the Canadian RPM Country Songs chart, reaching number twenty-six.

Chart performance

References 

1980 singles
Rosanne Cash songs
Columbia Records singles
1980 songs
Songs written by Karen Brooks
Song recordings produced by Rodney Crowell
Songs written by Gary P. Nunn